The Nipper Building is a colloquial name for The Victor condominiums, and formerly, Building 17, RCA Victor Company, Camden Plant. The structure is a historical building located in Cooper Grant neighborhood of Camden, Camden County, New Jersey, United States. Since 1901, Camden was the headquarters of the Victor Talking Machine Company, later RCA Victor. Originally a Victrola cabinet factory, the building was converted into luxury apartments and retail space in 2004.

History
The Nipper Building, now known as 'The Victor', was originally constructed during 1909-1916, by the architectural and engineering firm of Ballinger & Perrot.

Francis Barraud,  an unknown British artist, painted a picture of his brother's dog, "Nipper", sitting attentively in front of a gramophone. Nipper, a mixed-breed dog with probable terrier ancestry, became the best known dog in the world.  The painting, called His Master's Voice, was sold to the British Gramophone Company Ltd. and eventually became the trademarks of both the Gramophone Company and its new American affiliate, the Victor Talking Machine Company in 1901. In 1929, the Radio Corporation of America purchased the Victor Company and the acquisition included the Camden manufacturing plant and the "His Master's Voice" trademark. The four stained glass windows in the buildings tower depicting the "His Master's Voice" trademark were manufactured by D'Ascenzo Studios in Philadelphia and originally installed in 1915. The windows were illuminated at night and could be seen for several miles. In 1968, RCA introduced a new corporate logo and virtually retired both the "Victor" and Nipper trademarks. The windows were removed from the tower in 1969  and replaced with RCA's new logo painted on large sheets of plywood. Beginning in 1976, partly in response to public demand, the "His Master's Voice" trademark was reinstated to RCA record labels and other products and used widely again in RCA advertising. Several newspaper articles and news reports about Nipper's return, appeared at the time. April 10, 1979 was proclaimed "Nipper Day" in  New Jersey by Governor Brendan Byrne, and RCA held a ceremony in Camden dedicating four new stained glass windows, identical to the originals, which had been reinstalled in the tower. These windows were damaged by neglect and vandals after General Electric, which had absorbed RCA in 1986, vacated the building in the 1990s. The broken windows were replaced after the building was acquired by Dranoff Properties and converted into loft apartments.

During the 1970s and 1980s, some parts of the building were used by the RCA Government Communications Systems Division, for the development of computer systems for the U.S. intelligence community.

The Nipper Building is listed on the National Register of Historic Places.

The Victor 
After GE vacated the building in 1992, it deteriorated, was  vandalized and became a general eyesore to the surrounding area and was in danger of demolition. All but a few of the dozens of other old RCA Victor buildings at the Camden site had already been razed. In 1997, the building was listed on Preservation New Jersey's Ten Most Endangered sites list.

Utilizing the Investment Tax Credit, the structure was converted into a complex featuring a mix of 341 upscale loft apartments with outstanding views of the Philadelphia skyline. The restoration was completed in August 2003 at a cost of $65 million. under the guidance of BLT Architects. Approximately 80% of the project's funding came from private sources, namely through Dranoff Properties, Fleet Bank and Related Capital. Remaining funding came from various public sources including the Casino Reinvestment Development Authority, the New Jersey Redevelopment Authority and the Delaware River Port Authority.

See also 

National Register of Historic Places listings in Camden County, New Jersey
List of tallest buildings in Camden
Victor Talking Machine Company
Gramophone Company
His Master's Voice
Nipper
RCA

References

External links

About RCA - Nipper and Chipper
Dranoff Properties profile

Buildings and structures in Camden, New Jersey
National Historic Landmarks in New Jersey
Industrial buildings and structures on the National Register of Historic Places in New Jersey
Neoclassical architecture in New Jersey
Commercial buildings completed in 1916
National Register of Historic Places in Camden County, New Jersey
Apartment buildings in New Jersey
New Jersey Register of Historic Places
Residential skyscrapers in New Jersey
Skyscrapers in New Jersey
Victor Records